Myriophyllum spicatum (Eurasian watermilfoil or spiked water-milfoil) is native to Europe, Asia, and north Africa, but has a wide geographic and climatic distribution among some 57 countries, extending from northern Canada to South Africa. It is a submerged aquatic plant, grows in still or slow-moving water, and is considered to be a highly invasive species.

Description
The submerged leaves (usually between 15–35  mm long) are borne in pinnate whorls of four, with numerous thread-like leaflets roughly 4–13 mm long. Plants are monoecious with flowers produced in the leaf axils (male above, female below) on a spike 5–15 cm long held vertically above the water surface, each flower is inconspicuous, orange-red, 4–6 mm long. Eurasian water milfoil has 12- 21 pairs of leaflets while northern watermilfoil M. sibiricum only has 5–9 pairs. The two can hybridize and the resulting hybrid plants can cause taxonomic confusion as leaf characters are intermediate and can overlap with parent species.

Distribution
Myriophyllum spicatum is found in disperse regions of North America, Europe, Asia, Australia, and Africa.

Introduced areas
Myriophyllum spicatum was likely first introduced to North America in the 1940s where it has become an invasive species in some areas. Eurasian watermilfoil is now found across most of Northern America where it is recognized as a noxious weed.

Impact
In lakes or other aquatic areas where native aquatic plants are not well established, the Eurasian plant can spread quickly. It has been known to crowd out native plants and create dense mats that interfere with recreational activity. Dense growth of Eurasian milfoil can also have a negative impact on fisheries by creating microhabitats for juvenile fish and obstructing space for larger fish ultimately disrupting normal feeding patterns. Due to the Eurasian milfoil plant's inability to provide the same microhabitat for invertebrates as compared to native aquatic plant species, densely populated areas of Eurasian milfoil create an ecosystem with less food sources for the surrounding fish. Dense Eurasian milfoil growth can also create hypoxic zones by blocking out sun penetration to native aquatic vegetation preventing them from photosynthesizing. Eurasian watermilfoil grows primarily from broken off stems, known as shoot fragments, which increases the rate at which the plant can spread and grow. In some areas, the Eurasian Watermilfoil is an Aquatic Nuisance Species. Eurasian watermilfoil is known to hybridize with the native northern watermilfoil (M. sibiricum) and the hybrid taxon has also become invasive in North America. This hybridization has been observed across the upper midwestern United States (Indiana, Minnesota, Michigan, Wisconsin) and in the Northwest (Idaho, Washington).

Control
The aquatic moth Acentria ephemerella, the water veneer moth, feeds upon and damages this water milfoil. It has been used as an agent of biological pest control against the plant in North America. The milfoil weevil (Euhrychiopsis lecontei) has also been used as biocontrol. Another method for biocontrol is Grass Carp, (one of the Asian Carp species) which have been bred as sterile, is sometimes released into affected areas, since these fish primarily feed on aquatic plants and have proven effective at controlling the spread. However, the carp prefer many native species to the milfoil and will usually decimate preferred species before eating the milfoil. In Washington State the success rate of Grass Carp has been less than expected. They were used in 98 lakes and 39 percent of them had no submerged plant life left after only a short time.

Since roughly 2000, hand-harvesting of invasive milfoils has shown much success as a management technique. Several organizations in the New England states have undertaken large scale, lake-wide hand-harvesting management programs with extremely successful results. Acknowledgment had to be made that it is impossible to completely eradicate the species once it is established. As a result, maintenance must be done once an infestation has been reduced to affordably controlled levels. Well trained divers with proper techniques have been able to effectively control and then maintain many lakes, especially in the Adirondack Park in Northern New York where chemicals, mechanical harvesters, and other disruptive and largely unsuccessful management techniques are banned. After only three years of hand harvesting in Saranac Lake the program was able to reduce the amount harvested from over 18 tons to just 800 pounds per year.

In order to prevent damages from mass growth of the plant in lakes, the water level can be lowered. By freezing out the bottom of the bank in the winter months, the population of the plant decreases.

Management and spread prevention
Trailering boats has proven to be a significant vector by which Eurasian milfoil is able to spread and proliferate across otherwise disconnected bodies of water. Effective methods for mitigating this spread, are visual inspections with subsequent hand removal or pressure washing upon boat removal. In the Okanagan River Basin of south-central British Columbia, a specially-adapted rototiller is used to dredge shallow water to damage or destroy the root system.

Chemistry
Myriophyllum spicatum produces ellagic, gallic and pyrogallic acids and (+)-catechin, allelopathic polyphenols inhibiting the growth of blue-green alga Microcystis aeruginosa.

References

External links

 
 Species Profile- Eurasian Watermilfoil (Myriophyllum spicatum L.), National Invasive Species Information Center, United States National Agricultural Library.  Lists general information and resources for Eurasian Watermilfoil.

Flora Europaea: Myriophyllum spicatum
Flora of Taiwan: Myriophyllum spicatum
 
Invading Species.com Ontario Ministry of Natural Resources and the Ontario Federation of Anglers and Hunters
Jepson Manual Treatment
 USDA ARS. Foiling Watermilfoil
Photo gallery

spicatum
Flora of Lebanon
Plants described in 1753
Taxa named by Carl Linnaeus